Nam Shan, Tai Hang Tung & Tai Hang Sai is one of the 25 constituencies in the Sham Shui Po District of Hong Kong which was created in 2007.

The constituency loosely covers Nam Shan Estate, Tai Hang Tung Estate and Tai Hang Sai Estate with the estimated population of 19,773.

Councillors represented

Election results

2010s

2000s

References

Constituencies of Hong Kong
2007 in Hong Kong
Constituencies of Sham Shui Po District Council
2007 establishments in Hong Kong
Constituencies established in 2007
Shek Kip Mei